The École Niedermeyer is a Paris school for church music. It was founded in 1853 by Louis Niedermeyer as successor to the Institution royale de musique classique et religieuse, which had been established and run by Alexandre-Étienne Choron between 1817 and 1834. Several eminent French musicians studied at the school, including Gabriel Fauré, André Messager and Henri Büsser.

References

Music schools in Paris
Church music
1853 establishments in France